The Bear Lake Market on N. Main St. in Paris, Idaho dates from 1890.  It was listed o the National Register of Historic Places in 1982.

The listing included a two-story three-bay building and the adjoining one-story building to its north.  The one-story building has brick pilasters and leaded glass mezzanine lights.

It was deemed significant "as a fine example of local brickwork, and as the former home of the Shepherd mercantile operations, the main commercial enterprise to succeed the once-prominent cooperative store."

References

Commercial buildings on the National Register of Historic Places in Idaho
Buildings and structures completed in 1890
Bear Lake County, Idaho